Hilder v Dexter [1902] AC 474 is a UK company law case concerning shares.

Facts
To raise working capital, United Gold Coast Mining Properties Ltd offered shares at par value to Mr Hilder and others with an option to take further shares at par for two years. After the share price rose, Mr Hilder wished to exercise his option.

Judgment
Earl of Halsbury LC held that Hilder was entitled to exercise the option, as it in no way directly or indirectly contravened the rule against issuing shares at a discount under Companies Act 1900, section 8(2) (now Companies Act 2006, section 580).

See also
UK company law

References

United Kingdom company case law
House of Lords cases
1902 in case law
1902 in British law